In geometry, a stellation diagram or stellation pattern is a two-dimensional diagram in the plane of some face of a polyhedron, showing lines where other face planes intersect with this one. The lines cause 2D space to be divided up into regions. Regions not intersected by any further lines are called elementary regions. Usually unbounded regions are excluded from the diagram, along with any portions of the lines extending to infinity. Each elementary region represents a top face of one cell, and a bottom face of another.

A collection of these diagrams, one for each face type, can be used to represent any stellation of the polyhedron, by shading the regions which should appear in that stellation.

A stellation diagram exists for every face of a given polyhedron. In face transitive polyhedra, symmetry can be used to require all faces have the same diagram shading. Semiregular polyhedra like the Archimedean solids will have different stellation diagrams for different kinds of faces.

See also 
List of Wenninger polyhedron models
The fifty nine icosahedra

References 
 M Wenninger, Polyhedron models; Cambridge University Press, 1st Edn (1983), Ppbk (2003).
 (1st Edn University of Toronto (1938))

External links 

Stellation diagram
Polyhedra Stellations Applet Vladimir Bulatov, 1998
 http://bulatov.org/polyhedra/stellation/index.html Polyhedra Stellation (VRML)
 http://bulatov.org/polyhedra/icosahedron/index_vrml.html 59 stellations of icosahedron 
 http://www.queenhill.demon.co.uk/polyhedra/FacetingDiagrams/FacetingDiags.htm facetting diagrams
 http://fortran.orpheusweb.co.uk/Poly/Ex/dodstl.htm Stellating the Dodecahedron
 http://www.queenhill.demon.co.uk/polyhedra/icosa/stelfacet/StelFacet.htm Towards stellating the icosahedron and faceting the dodecahedron
 http://www.mathconsult.ch/showroom/icosahedra/index.html 59 stellations of the icosahedron
 http://www.uwgb.edu/dutchs/symmetry/stellate.htm Stellations of Polyhedra
 http://www.uwgb.edu/dutchs/symmetry/stelicos.htm Coxeter's Classification and Notation
 http://www.georgehart.com/virtual-polyhedra/stellations-icosahedron-index.html